, better known as , is a Japanese essayist and tarento represented by Production Pao.

Bibliography

Translations

Filmography

TV series

Radio series

References

External links
Culture Club profile 
System Brain profile 

Japanese essayists
Japanese entertainers
1948 births
Living people
People from Tokyo
Inukai family